Sembadu is a village in Vellore district, Tamil Nadu. Sembadu is situated in between Arcot and Kalavai road. It is 16 km from Arcot and 7 km from Kalavai. It belongs to Sembedu village panchayat.

Villages in Vellore district